Papestra quadrata is a species of cutworm or dart moth in the family Noctuidae. It is found in North America.

The MONA or Hodges number for Papestra quadrata is 10310.

Subspecies
These two subspecies belong to the species Papestra quadrata:
 Papestra quadrata ingravis Smith, 1895
 Papestra quadrata quadrata

References

Further reading

 
 
 

Hadenini
Articles created by Qbugbot
Moths described in 1891